Albert Clinton Tyler (January 4, 1872 – July 25, 1945) was an American pole vaulter who won a silver medal at the 1896 Summer Olympics in Athens.

Tyler was a member of the Franklin (Ohio) Class of 1888. While studying at Princeton University Tyler also played American football and baseball. He graduated in 1897 and became a school teacher and football official. He died of pneumonia while on vacation in Maine.

References

External links

1872 births
1945 deaths
Deaths from pneumonia in Maine
American male pole vaulters
Athletes (track and field) at the 1896 Summer Olympics
19th-century sportsmen
Olympic silver medalists for the United States in track and field
People from Glendale, Ohio
Medalists at the 1896 Summer Olympics
Sportspeople from Ohio